Guy W. Millner (born February 16, 1936) is an American multi-millionaire businessman who ran as a Republican for Governor of Georgia in 1994, United States Senator from Georgia in 1996 and Governor of Georgia in 1998, losing all three races.

Millner came closest to victory in 1994, winning 48% of the vote against incumbent Governor Zell Miller after defeating four other candidates in the Republican primary election. His subsequent defeats were by increasingly large margins.  He lost to state secretary of state and former Carter Veterans Affairs Administrator Max Cleland for the United States Senate in 1996 after narrowly defeating Johnny Isakson for the Republican nomination.  His final defeat, at the hands of State Representative Roy Barnes for governor in 1998, was by a margin of 53% to 44%.  He has not sought office again.

Millner's campaigns were largely self-financed and he remains a major financial backer of Republican candidates.

Millner is the founder of Norrell Corporation, a temporary help company later acquired by Spherion, which in turn was acquired by Randstad NV. In 2000, he was reportedly worth more than $100 million. He later joined the board of Source2

He and his wife have hosted fundraisers at his home for Fix Georgia Pets, a nonprofit that works to spay and neuter dogs and cats in Georgia.

In 2019 he bought a waterfront condo in Palm Beach, Florida for $5 million.

References

External links

|-

1936 births
Georgia (U.S. state) Republicans
Living people
People from Holly Hill, Florida
American chief executives
Florida State University alumni